Tang ping is a Mandarin term that describes a rejection of societal pressures to overwork, such as in the 996 working hour system, which is often regarded as a rat race with ever diminishing returns. Those who participate in tang ping instead choose to "lie down flat and get over the beatings" via a low-desire, more indifferent attitude towards life. It can be thought as the Chinese equivalent of the hippie counter-culture movement.

Novelist Liao Zenghu described "lying flat" as a resistance movement, and The New York Times called it part of a nascent Chinese counterculture. It has also been compared to the Great Resignation, a surge of resignations that began in the United States and much of the Western world at roughly the same time. The National Language Resources Monitoring and Research Center, an institution affiliated to Education Ministry of China, listed the word as one of the 10 most popular memes for 2021 in Chinese Internet. Chinese search engine Sogou also listed the word at the top of its list of most trending memes for 2021.

Unlike the hikikomori in Japan who are socially withdrawn, these young Chinese people who subscribe to "lying flat" are not necessarily socially isolated, but merely choose to lower their professional and economic ambitions and simplify their goals, still being fiscally productive for their own essential needs, and prioritize psychological health over economic materialism.

The phrase quiet quitting, meaning doing only what one's job demands and nothing more, which became popular in the United States in 2022, was thought to be inspired by the Tang Ping movement. Another newer related phrase is bai lan, which means  "to actively embrace a deteriorating situation, rather than trying to turn it around".

Origin 
Bailan refers to actions from a losing team when they stop trying to win so they can end the game. This term first appeared around February 2020, at the beginning of the pandemic, which is on the Chinese Internet. But, the movement began in April 2021 with a post by Luo Huazhong (username "Kind-Hearted Traveler") on the internet forum Baidu Tieba, in which he discussed his reasons for living a low-key, minimalist lifestyle. In 2016, 26-year-old Luo quit his factory job because it made him feel empty. He then cycled  from Sichuan to Tibet, and now back in his home town Jiande in eastern Zhejiang Province, spends his time reading philosophy, and gets by doing a few odd jobs and taking US$60 a month from his savings. He only eats two meals a day.

Luo's post, entitled with "Lying Flat is Justice", illustrates:

Luo's post and story quickly gained a following on social media, being discussed and soon becoming a buzzword on Sina Weibo and Douban. The idea was praised by many and inspired numerous memes, and has been described as a sort of spiritual movement. Business magazine ABC Money claimed it resonated with a growing silent majority of youth disillusioned by the officially endorsed "Chinese Dream" that encourages a life of hard work and sacrifice with no actual life satisfaction to show for it, spawning the catchphrase "a chive lying flat is difficult to reap".

Response 
The Chinese Communist Party (CCP) moved quickly to reject the idea. The CAC internet regulator ordered online platforms to "strictly restrict" posts on tang ping and had censors remove Luo's original Tieba post while a discussion group of nearly 10,000 followers on Chinese social media site Douban is no longer accessible. Selling tang ping-branded merchandise online is forbidden.

In May 2021, Chinese state media Xinhua published an editorial asserting that "lying flat" is shameful. In May, a video clip of CCTV news commentator Bai Yansong criticizing the low-key mindset circulated on the popular video-sharing website Bilibili, and had attracted thousands of mockeries and slurs on the danmu commentaries in response. The same month, a commentary of Hubei Radio and Television Economic Channel said, "you can accept your fate, but you mustn't lie flat." An October article by CCP general secretary Xi Jinping, published in the Communist Party journal Qiushi, called for "avoiding 'involution' [nei juan] and 'lying flat.

However, there were official voices offering more empathic opinions on the tang ping phenomenon. Beijing's party-affiliated Guangming Daily newspaper added that tang ping should not be discounted without reflection—if China wants to cultivate diligence in the young generation, it should first try to improve their quality of life. Huang Ping, a literature professor who researches youth culture at East China Normal University, told Sixth Tone that official media outlets may be concerned about the tang ping lifestyle because of its potential to threaten productivity, but "humans aren't merely tools for making things... when you can't catch up with society's development—say, skyrocketing home prices—tang ping is actually the most rational choice."

See also 
 9X Generation
 Buddha-like mindset
 Goblin mode
 Herbivore men
 Hikikomori - Japanese term for acute social withdrawal
 Involution
 Karoshi - Japanese term for overwork death
 N-po generation
 NEET - acronym for "Not in Education, Employment, or Training"
 Quiet quitting - a  movement in which employees work within defined work hours
 Refusal of work
 Sampo generation
 Satori generation
 Slacker
 Strawberry generation
 Work-to-rule
 Zhou Liqi – Chinese slacker influencer

References

Further reading

2021 in China
Counterculture
Criticism of work
Employment in China
Social issues in China
2021 neologisms
Chinese youth culture